Vonck is a Dutch surname. Vonk means "spark" and refers to the work of a Smith. The surname can refer to several people:

Elias Vonck (1605–1652), Dutch Golden Age painter
Jan Vonck (1631–1664), Dutch Golden Age painter
Jan Frans Vonck (1743–1792), lawyer and one of the leaders of the Brabant Revolution
Rico Vonck (born 1987), Dutch darts player

See also 
Vonk (surname)

References

Dutch-language surnames